Choristoneura improvisana is a species of moth of the family Tortricidae. It is found in Primorsky Krai in the Russian Far East. The habitat consists of bald mountain peaks and green moss-spruce forests.

The wingspan is 14–15 mm. The ground colour of the forewings is grey, with indistinct yellowish granulation and a dark brown pattern. All spots and stripes are bordered with yellow scales. The hindwings are uniform grey.

References

Moths described in 1973
Choristoneura